Chichaklu (also Romanized as Chīchaklū; also known as Chechaklū and Chichiklu) is a village in Abarghan Rural District, in the Central District of Sarab County, East Azerbaijan Province, Iran. At the 2006 census, its population was 321, in 59 families.

References 

Populated places in Sarab County